Heliozela castaneella is a moth of the Heliozelidae family. It was described by Inoue in 1982. It is found in Japan.

The wingspan is 4–5 mm.

References

Moths described in 1982
Heliozelidae
Moths of Japan